Morgedal is a village in the municipality of Kviteseid, Telemark, Norway. The village has been described as the "cradle of skiing".

Morgedal, Norway is a village whose most famous residents were Sondre Norheim, known to be the father of modern skiing, Torjus Hemmestveit, and Mikkjel Hemmestveit. The Hemmestveit brothers created the world's first skiing school at Christiania, Norway in 1881 before emigrating to the United States in the late 19th century.

Olav Bjaaland, another skier from Morgedal, journeyed to the South Pole as a member of Amundsen's South Pole expedition; Bjaaland skied at the front of the expedition party so that the sled dogs had something to run after.

The Olympic Flames for the 1952 Winter Olympics in Oslo and the 1960 Winter Olympics in Squaw Valley, and the flame used in the national torch relay for the 1994 Winter Olympics in Lillehammer (which was later used as the flame for the 1994 Winter Paralympics), were all lit at the birthplace of Sondre Norheim, Øvrebø in Morgedal.

Notable people

References

External links
 Morgedal - Den moderne skisportens vogge, Website
 Sondre Norheim - the Skiing Pioneer of Telemark

Villages in Vestfold og Telemark
Kviteseid